Restless Books is an independent, non-profit publisher located in Brooklyn, New York. Restless publishes "international works of fiction, journalism, memoirs, travel writing, and illustrated books." The press published 15-20 titles a year, including authors Ruth Ozeki, Lana Bastašić, Yishai Sarid, Andrea Chapela, Sachiko Kashiwaba,  Tash Aw, Chris Abani, Gabriela Wiener, and Giacomo Sartori. It includes the Yonder imprint for younger readers.

History
Restless Books was founded in 2013 by Ilan Stavans, Annette Hochstein, and Joshua Ellison as an international press.

Restless Books Prize for New Immigrant Writing

Restless inaugurated the annual $10,000 Prize for New Immigrant Writing in 2016. The prize comes with a publication deal.

Winners of the New Immigrant Writing Prize
 2016: Deepak Unnikrishnan for Temporary People
 2017: Grace Talusan for The Body Papers
2018: Priyanka A. Champaneri for The City of Good Death
2019: Rajiv Mohabir for Antiman: A Hybrid Memoir
2020: Meron Hadero for A Down Home Meal for These Difficult Times
2021: Ani Gjika for By Its Right Name

References

Publishing companies based in New York City
2013 establishments in New York (state)